Celaya is a city and its surrounding municipality in the state of Guanajuato, Mexico, located in the southeast quadrant of the state. It is the third most populous city in the state, with a 2005 census population of 310,413. The municipality for which the city serves as municipal seat, had a population of 415,869. The city is located in the geographic center of the municipality, which has an areal extent of 553.18 km2 (213.58 sq mi) and includes many smaller outlying communities, the largest of which are San Miguel Octopan, Rincón de Tamayo and San Juan de la Vega.

There are many smaller towns around Celaya including Rincón de Tamayo, Tarimoro, Villagrán, La Moncada, Panales Jamaica (Cañones), Panales Galera, La Calera, La Estancia, La Noria, Los Fierros, El Acebuche, Cacalote, and Charco Largo. It is also not far away from Cortazar, Salamanca, Salvatierra, Apaseo el Grande, Querétaro City and among others. The city was founded in 1570 as Villa de la Purisíma Concepción de Zalaya. The word Zalaya is of Basque origin and means "Flat Land".

History 

Celaya was a frontier region between the Purépecha and the Chichimecas.

General Álvaro Obregón defeated Pancho Villa in the Battle of Celaya in 1915, as referred by Martínez Celaya was also the Guanajuato state capital for a short period.

An explosion in a gunpowder and fireworks warehouse in September, 1999, killed over 60 people and injured over 300 people.

On 23 May 2022, eleven people were murdered in a massacre linked to the Mexican drug war.

Climate
Celaya has a semi-arid climate (Köppen climate classification BSh).

Education
Centro Pedagogico de Celaya
Colegio Arturo Rosenblueth
Colegio Marista
Colegio Nuevo Continente Bajío Celaya Campus
• Complejo Educativo Ignacio Allende
Colegio Mexico
Escuela Bilingue Guilford
Instituto Andersen
Instituto Bilingue Oxford
Instituto Británico de Celaya (BIC)
Instituto Educativo Rosa G. de Carmona
Instituto Kipling
Instituto Sir Winston Churchill
Instituto Tecnologico de Celaya
Instituto Tecnologico de Roque
Instituto Universitario del Centro de México (UCEM)
Tecnologico de Monterrey
Universidad de Celaya
Universidad de Guanajuato
Universidad de Itesba
Universidad Lasallista Benavente 
Universidad Latina de Mexico
Westminster Royal College

Attractions

Ball of Water

The Ball of Water reservoir has been a city icon since 1908; it continues to supply water to portions of downtown. The tank was manufactured in Germany and assembled on site, and is unique in being assembled using rivets rather than welds. It is believed to be the only one of its kind with a spherical shape (it is rumored that there was another similar water ball in Stuttgart, Germany that was destroyed during the Second World War). Traditionally, locals tell visitors that it is filled with cajeta, taking them to visit the "Bola del Agua" on Sundays, the traditional day for visiting the Independencia Lane. A plaque at the base of the water tower features the legend (in Spanish):

The work was carried out under the command of German Enrique Schöndube, although it is known that payment for the construction took ten years due to the start of the Mexican Revolution, so it was paid once the new government established. During the Mexican Revolution, Villa's officers thought the hydraulic tower had such a large amount of water that destroying it would drown the population of Celaya. One of Villa's generals ordered his artillery to destroy it. Captain Gustavo Duron, in charge of a 75mm battery, followed the orders but shot around the tower, avoiding it and protecting the monument, as mentioned by local historian Herminio Martínez. The construction resulted in the neglect of the people handing out water at home from the mayor's office called water carriers. Commercial advertising on its surface was allowed for several years to cover the costs of the reservoir, ending on September 8, 1980 when, in celebration of upcoming 410th Anniversary of the Foundation of Celaya, the mayor in charge decreed that the Ball of Water would be a symbol that would represent the city, and the placement of advertisements was banned.

Cuisine
Celaya is also known for the artisanal production of cajeta, a type of milk candy.

Transportation
The Celaya Airport had (as of January 22, 2007) commercial flights to Santiago de Querétaro and connections from there to other destinations; these services were dropped in 2008. Celaya lies along the El Paso Spur of the Pan-American Highway which is known locally as Mexican Federal Highway 45.

People
 Marta Sahagún de Fox (b. April 10, 1953), former Mexican First Lady and wife of President Vicente Fox, lived in Celaya and unsuccessfully ran for mayor 
 Miguel Martínez (b. September 29, 1921), Musician, composer and songwriter. Considered the father of the modern mariachi trumpet.
 Francisco Eduardo Tresguerras (b. October 13, 1759, d. August 3, 1833), Architect and painter. Designed the El Carmen church in Celaya.
 Joshua Ilika Brenner (b. September 14, 1976) Olympic swimmer
 Liliana Ibáñez (b. January 30, 1991) Olympic swimmer
 Raúl Velasco (b. April 24, 1933, d. November 26, 2006) Entertainer and TV Producer. Was the host of the TV program Siempre en Domingo.
 Octavio Ocampo (b. February 28, 1943) Painter known for his "metamorphosis" style.
 Mauricio Ochmann (b. November 16, 1977), Actor.
 Ever Guzmán (b. March 15, 1988), footballer.
 José Juan Vázquez (b. 14 March 1988), Mexican footballer, who currently plays in Club Leon.
 David Roberto Bárcena Ríos (26 December 1941 – 22 February 2017) was a Mexican equestrian who competed at five Olympic Games, winning a bronze medial in the Team Event at his fifth Olympics
 Lalo Duron (b. September 6, 1963). Author of "Alive & Well!", "¿Jubilarme? Ni de chiste", writer, and creator of "Creado en México", and "Emprende" movements in Mexico.

Sister cities
 Carrboro, North Carolina, United States
 Chapel Hill, North Carolina, United States
 Guernica, Spain
 Oaxaca, Mexico
 Tuxtla Gutiérrez, Mexico

See also
 Club Celaya a football club from the 1950s that was resurrected in 2003
 Atlético Celaya a former association football team
 Auditorio Tresguerras
 Estadio Miguel Alemán
 Roman Catholic Diocese of Celaya
 Immaculate Conception Cathedral, Celaya

References

Sources
Link to tables of population data from Census of 2005 INEGI: Instituto Nacional de Estadística, Geografía e Informática
Guanajuato Enciclopedia de los Municipios de México

External links 
 
 A casi 100 años de la Bola de Agua (Near the century of "Ball of Water")
 PODCelaya.com Business Virtual Directory
 Diócesis de Celaya
 Domingo Negro Explosion

 
Municipalities of Guanajuato
Otomi settlements
Populated places established in 1570
Populated places in Guanajuato